Solihull Metropolitan Borough Council elections are generally held three years out of every four, with a third of the council being elected each time. Solihull Metropolitan Borough Council is the local authority for the metropolitan borough of Solihull in the West Midlands, England. Since the last boundary changes in 2004, 51 councillors have been elected from 17 wards.

Political control
Solihull was a municipal borough from 1954, with a borough council. It was made a county borough in 1964, becoming independent from Warwickshire County Council. Under the Local Government Act 1972 it had its territory enlarged and became a metropolitan borough, with West Midlands County Council providing county-level services. The first election to the reconstituted borough council was held in 1973, initially operating as a shadow authority before coming into its revised powers on 1 April 1974. West Midlands County Council was abolished in 1986 and Solihull became a unitary authority. Political control of the council since 1974 has been held by the following parties:

Leadership
The leaders of the council since 2005 have been:

Council elections

Borough result maps

By-election results
By-elections occur when seats become vacant between council elections. Below is a summary of the by-elections; full by-election results can be found by clicking on the by-election name.

References

External links
Solihull Metropolitan Borough Council

 
Politics of Solihull
Council elections in the West Midlands (county)
Solihull